Post Rock may refer to:
 Post-rock, a form of experimental rock music
 Post Rock (South Georgia), a small promontory near the west end of South Georgia
 Post Rock Limestone, a historic stone post material from Kansas
 Post Rock Scenic Byway, named for the abundant stone posts in the landscape